Daniel Guérard (born April 9, 1974) is a Canadian former professional ice hockey player. Guerard was born in Montreal, Quebec, but grew up in LaSalle, Quebec.

Playing career
As a youth, Guérard played in the 1987 and 1988 Quebec International Pee-Wee Hockey Tournaments with a minor ice hockey team from Verdun, Quebec.

Guérard played two games for the Ottawa Senators of the National Hockey League during the 1994–95 NHL season. He was drafted 98th overall by the Senators in the 1992 NHL Entry Draft and joined the team in 1994.  As well as the two games he played for the Senators in 94–95, he scored 20 goals for their farm team the Prince Edward Island Senators of the American Hockey League that season. However, injures destroyed any potential he had and only managed to score three times the next season. After a spell with the Worcester IceCats, he moved to Europe and had spells in Austria, Slovenia, Germany and France. He returned to Quebec in 1999 to play in the Quebec Semi-Pro Hockey League where he played for the Lasalle Rapides for four seasons followed by spells with the Sorel Royaux and the St. Jean Mission before retiring in 2004.

Career statistics

Regular season and playoffs

References

External links
 

1974 births
Living people
Brûleurs de Loups players
Canadian ice hockey right wingers
French Quebecers
HK Acroni Jesenice players
New Haven Senators players
Ottawa Senators draft picks
Ottawa Senators players
Prince Edward Island Senators players
Ice hockey people from Montreal
Wipptal Broncos players
Verdun Collège Français players
VEU Feldkirch players
Victoriaville Tigres players
Worcester IceCats players